The 1931 County Championship was the 38th officially organised running of the County Championship. Yorkshire County Cricket Club won the championship title.

The method of scoring points was changed again. Fifteen points were awarded for the side winning a match and both sides received 7.5 points for a tied match.

Table

 includes one tie on first innings

References

1931 in English cricket
County Championship seasons